Slight Side is a fell in the English Lake District it stands 25 kilometres east southeast of the town of Whitehaven and reaches a height of 762 m (2,499 ft). Slight Side lies at the south western edge of the Scafell Massif, a four-kilometre-long crescent of high ground which includes the highest ground in England. The fells names derives from the Old Norse language and means "The mountain shieling with the level pastures", it is a combination of the Norse words "sletta" and "saetr". With a shieling meaning a shepherds hut or a mountain pasture used in the summer.

Topography
When viewed from the valley of Eskdale the fell is seen as a distinct peak but in reality it is just the terminal point on Scafell’s southern ridge before it descends steeply to Eskdale. It only has 14 metres of topographic prominence between itself and Scafell (the col is at 748 metres) and therefore narrowly fails to qualify as a Nuttall  hill or a Hewitt and it is left to Alfred Wainwright to give Slight Side the status of a separate fell in his Pictorial Guide to the Lakeland Fells.

Slight Side is steep and craggy on all sides except to the north where the ridge runs to Scafell. The eastern flank falls to the valley of the infant River Esk while the slopes to the west descend across Eskdale Fell towards Burnmoor Tarn. Horn Crag stands to the south of the summit overlooking Eskdale. Just under a kilometre to the north past the 748m col is Long Green which is the summit of Cam Spout crags. When viewed from a distance (see picture) or even when walking, Long Green can be mistaken for the summit of Slight Side. Cam Spout Crag is a rock climbing location, although not a particularly busy one, with 12 climbs including Cam Spout Buttress and Eskdale Grooves.

Ascents
One possible ascent of Slight Side is from Eskdale and this is often completed in conjunction with Scafell, and possibly Scafell Pike as well. The ascent may be started at the hamlet of Boot. It takes the path which passes Eel Tarn and Stony Tarn before crossing bouldery ground to climb the broad ridge to the summit. Scafell stands two kilometres to the north and is reached by a vertical ascent of 230 metres. The fell can be bagged with little effort while descending to Eskdale from Scafell by the southern ridge.

Summit
The summit of Slight Side is a fine rocky peak and is listed by Alfred Wainwright as one of the six best summits in the Lake District, calling it “rocky, shapely and well defined and can be attained only by a rough final scramble”. The highlight of the view from the summit is the vista westward towards the sea.

References
 Pictorial Guide to the Lakeland Fells, Southern Fells, Alfred Wainwright 
 Complete Lakeland Fells, Bill Birkett 
 The Mountains of England and Wales, John and Anne Nuttall 
 Place names of the Lake District

External links 

Fells of the Lake District
Borough of Copeland